Richard H.K. Onishi is an American politician and a Democratic member of the Hawaii House of Representatives since January 16, 2013 representing District 3.

Education
Onishi attended Honolulu Community College and earned his bachelor's degree in business administration from the University of Hawaii.

Elections
2012 With Democratic Representative Clift Tsuji redistricted to District 2, Onishi won the District 3 August 11, 2012 Democratic Primary with 3,298 votes (56.2%), and won the three-way November 6, 2012 General election with 4,937 votes (54.8%) against Republican nominee Marlene Hapai and Libertarian candidate Frederick Fogel. who had both run for House seats in 2010.

References

External links
Official page at the Hawaii State Legislature
Campaign site
 

Place of birth missing (living people)
Year of birth missing (living people)
Living people
Democratic Party members of the Hawaii House of Representatives
Honolulu Community College alumni
21st-century American politicians
Hawaii politicians of Japanese descent
University of Hawaiʻi at Mānoa alumni